Mickey Strole is an American paralympic swimmer. She competed at the 1976 Summer Paralympics, winning four silver and a bronze medals.

References 

American female swimmers
American female track and field athletes
20th-century American women
Paralympic swimmers of the United States
Paralympic track and field athletes of the United States
Swimmers at the 1976 Summer Paralympics
Athletes (track and field) at the 1976 Summer Paralympics
Medalists at the 1976 Summer Paralympics
Paralympic silver medalists for the United States
Paralympic bronze medalists for the United States
Paralympic medalists in swimming
Paralympic medalists in athletics (track and field)